ERAP may refer to:

 Economic Research and Action Project, community organizing programs from the Students for a Democratic Society.
 Entreprise de recherches et d'activités pétrolières, French petroleum company
 Erap, nickname for 13th President of the Philippines Joseph Estrada
 Endoplasmic reticulum aminopeptidase protein, a class of enzymes
 ERAP1
 ERAP2